Agladrillia fuegiensis is a species of sea snail, a marine gastropod mollusk in the family Drilliidae.

Description
The size of an adult shell varies between 8 mm and 20 mm.

The short, purplish-pink colored shell has a fusiform shape. The base of the shell has a pale color. The shell consists of seven whorls, of which two in the large and obtuse protoconch. The oblique ribs are the thickest at their upper ends. The purplish-pink color is deepened at the middle of the body whorl, forming an obscure spiral band. The aperture equals the 2/5 of the length of the shell. The thin outer lip is sinuate close to the suture. The columella is slightly arcuate in the middle and oblique at its base. The short siphonal canal is wide and slightly recurved.

Distribution
This marine species occurs off Tierra del Fuego, the Strait of Magellan and off the Falklands.

References

External links
 

fuegiensis
Gastropods described in 1888